Toxoderidae is a family of praying mantises.

Subordinate taxa
The Mantodea Species File lists:

Subfamily Compsothespinae
Genus Compsothespis Saussure, 1872

Subfamily Heterochaetinae
Genus  Westwood, 1845

Subfamily Oxyothespinae
Tribe Heterochaetulini
Genus Heterochaetula Wood-Mason, 1889
Tribe Oxyothespini
Genus Acithespis Giglio-Tos, 1916
Genus Lobothespis La Greca & Lombardo, 1987
Genus Oxyothespis Saussure, 1870
Genus Paraseverinia Lombardo, 1991
Genus Severinia Finot, 1902
Genus Sinaiella Karsch, 1892
Genus Somalithespis Lombardo, 1991

Subfamily Toxoderinae
Distribution: includes Africa, Middle-East, Asia
Tribe Aethalochroini
Genus Aethalochroa Wood-Mason, 1877
Genus Oestomantis Giglio-Tos, 1914
Genus Pareuthyphlebs Werner, 1928

Tribe Calamothespini
Distribution: Africa
Genus Belomantis Giglio-Tos, 1914
Genus Calamothespis Werner, 1907
Genus Toxomantis Giglio-Tos, 1914

Tribe Toxoderini
Genus Metatoxodera Roy, 2009
Genus Paratoxodera Wood-Mason, 1889
Genus Protoxodera Roy, 2009
Genus Stenotoxodera Roy, 2009
Genus Toxodera Serville, 1837

Tribe Toxoderopsini
Genus Euthyphleps Wood-Mason, 1889
Genus Toxodanuria Uvarov, 1940
Genus Toxoderella Giglio-Tos, 1914
Genus Toxoderopsis Wood-Mason, 1889

See also
List of mantis genera and species

References

External links 

 
Mantodea families
Taxa named by Ermanno Giglio-Tos